Avalon Heights International School is a coeducational secondary school located in Vashi, Navi Mumbai. It is affiliated to the Indian Certificate of Secondary Education (ICSE) and was established in 1998. The school has over 1200 students and is located near APMC Market in Navi Mumbai.

It was ranked among the Top 10 Navi Mumbai Schools in the survey conducted by Hindustan Times in 2019.

History 
The School was founded by Mrs. Kamlesh Sharma/ Mrs. Simi Sharma in 1998 in a small bungalow in Navi Mumbai with few students, all in the pre-nursery classes. Later the school shifted to a building on an educational reserved plot allotted by the Navi Mumbai Municipal Corporation and began classes up till 10th grade; 11th and 12th grade were added in 2017. A branch named Avalon World School Pvt. Ltd. was established in Ajman, UAE and began operations in October 2015.

Overview

Rankings 

It was featured in the Hindustan Times again in 2014 for its teaching system, and for practices like daily meditation.

Faculty 
There is 10:1 Teacher-to-Student-Ratio. Teachers do not live on campus. There are also maushi's and bhaiya's present on campus to help the children and school.

Heads of staff 
 Director & Founder - Mrs. Simi Sharma
 Principal - Mrs.Anahita Landers
 Section Co-Ordinator - Mrs. Saloni Lonial
 Admin Head -  Mrs Kanchan Chandni

School features 
The school follows the ICSE course syllabus, as set out by the CISCE board in Delhi. It used to follow IGCSE as well, but it was discontinued in 2013. 

It runs classes from kindergarten to the 12th grade. The average class size is 25-30 students, the number being greater in the junior classes.

The students are divided among four houses named Daffodil, Orchid, Iris and Tulip (coloured yellow, blue, green and pink respectively) which compete through the year in extracurricular activities to win the House Trophy. 
The school has a distinct Student Council and looks after the discipline and organises all events. It is led by the President and the Vice-President along with the Head Boy and Head Girl, who work together with Deputies, House Captains and Prefects. The middle section maintains its own Student Council. Each house is looked after by a teacher-in-charge.

Annual days 
The school hosts three annual days, one for the middle school, one for the primary school and one for pre-primary school respectively. It consists of an annual report on the school and an extravagant play-reproduction. These plays are usually held at Vishnudas Bhave Auditorium. The plays up to date have been

Notable alumni
 Shivam Mahadevan, Singer (Dhoom 3 - Bande Hain Ham Usk), Son of Shankar Mahadevan

Avalon World School, Ajman, UAE. 
Avalon World School Pvt. Ltd is a branch of Avalon Heights International School, located in Ajman, UAE. The school was inaugurated and began operations in October 2015. It is being headed by a British principal and is affiliated to the IGCSE curriculum. It currently only operates pre-nursery classes.

References

Education in Navi Mumbai
Private schools in Mumbai
Educational institutions established in 1998
1998 establishments in Maharashtra
International schools in Mumbai
Cambridge schools in India